Original programming currently and formerly broadcast by Puthuyugam TV:

Currently broadcast 

 Alayangal Adpudhangal

 Neram Nalla neram
 Rasipalanl
 Rusikalam Vanga

Formerly broadcast

Comedy series
 Arasiyalla Ithellam Saatharanamappaa (அரசியல்ல இதெல்லாம் சாதாரணமப்பா)
 Krishna Lattu thinna Asaiya (கிருஷ்ணா லட்டு தின்ன ஆசையா)

Mythology series
 Nayanmargal (நாயன்மார்கள்)

Soap operas

 Agni Paravai (அக்னி பறவை)
 Arangetram (அரங்கேற்றம்)
 Kadamai Kanniyam Kattupaadu (கடமை கண்ணியம் கட்டுப்பாடு)
 Kayitham (காயிதம்)
 Malli (மல்லி)
 Sare Gama Gama Gama (சரி கம கம கம)
 Unarvugal (உணர்வுகள்)

Korean dramas

 K-Series
 The 1st Shop of Coffee Prince 
 Boys Over Flowers 
 The Greatest Love 
 The Heirs
 Iris 
 Master's Sun 
 Moon Embracing the Sun 
 My Love from the Star
 Pasta 
 Playful Kiss 
 Secret Garden 
 To the Beautiful You
 You're Beautiful

Dubbed soap operas

 Anamika
 Asoakavanam
 Azhagiya Tamil Magal
 Indru Poi Naalai Vaa?
 Kalloori Paravaikal
 Pattu Selai
Reporters
 Sippikul Muthu
 Snegithiyae
 Sri Krishna Avatharam
 Sri Saneeswara Mahimai
 Thik Thik Thikil
 Vikramathithan Simmasanam
 Vizhiye Kathai Eluthu

Reality/non-scripted shows

 6 Doctorgal 1008 Kelvigal
 6 Suvai 100 Vagai
 Arindhathum Ariyathathum
 Azhake Ayiram
 Bicycle Dairy
 Celebrity Kitchen
 Doctor On Call
 Dosth Bada Dosth
 Guru Sishyan
 Hello Doctor
 Ippadi Panreengale Ma
 K2K.com Rasikka Rusikka
 Kadhalil Sodhapathathu Eppadi
 Kalvi 360
 Karuppu Vellai
 Kelvi Paathi Kindal Paathi
 Madhan Movie Matinee
 Manam Thirumbuthe
 Manithanum Marmangalum
 Melam Kottu Thali Kattu (Season: 1&2)
 Natchathira Jannal (Season: 1&2)
 Odi Vilayadu Mummy
 Oru Nimidam Please
 Padatha Patellam
 Red Carpet
 Rishimoolam
 Star Junction
 Stars Day Out
 Thiramai Pongum Thamizhagam
 Town Galatta
 Ungal Kitchen Engal Chef
 Uravai Thedi
 Veedu Thandi Varuvaya
 Vina Vidai Vettai
 Vina Vidai Vettai Juniors
 Vina Vidai Vettai Juniors (season 2)
 Yaavarum Kelir
 Yuppies Ku Mattum Alla

List of movies
Madurai Mappillai (2007)
Kozhi Koovuthu (2012)
Karutha Kannan C/O Rekla Race (2012)
Pannaiyarum Padminiyum (2013)
Summa Nachunu Irukku (2013)
Mathapoo (2013)
Sutta Kadhai (2013)
Ego (2013)
Inji Murappa (2015)

References

Puthuyugam TV
Puthuyugam TV